The M.A.M.A. awards is an annual music awards ceremony in Lithuania.

Host cities

Nominations

Current nominations

References

External links

European music awards
2011 establishments in Lithuania
Awards established in 2011
Lithuanian awards